Entissar Amer (born 3 December 1956) is the current First Lady of Egypt, since her husband Abdel Fattah el-Sisi became the Sixth President of Egypt on 8 June 2014.

Education 
Amer received her high school diploma from El Abbassia High School in 1977. She received a BCom degree in accounting from Ain Shams University.

Family 
Amer married her cousin el-Sisi in 1977 after el-Sisi graduated from the Military Academy. They have three sons and one daughter: Mahmoud, Mostafa, Hassan and Aya.

Amer became the First Lady of Egypt upon her husband's appointment as the President of Egypt after the June 2013 Egyptian protests; which pushed for a military coup throwing Mohamed Morsi out of power. Judge Adly Mansour was appointed as an acting president during the transitional period from 3 July 2013 to 7 June 2014. Then, el-Sisi won the presidential election that was held afterward, and took the oath of office on 8 June 2014.

Corruption allegation 
An Egyptian who was formerly a military contractor, Mohamed Ali, alleged that Entissar Amer was part of "rampant corruption" involving military officials and Sisi's relatives. Street protests took place in response to Ali's claims about Amer and her husband.

References

20th-century Egyptian women
21st-century Egyptian women
1956 births
Ain Shams University alumni
First ladies of Egypt
Living people
El-Sisi family